The 2011 Casino Rama Curling Skins Game on TSN was held on January 22 and 23 at the Casino Rama Entertainment Centre in Rama, Ontario.  The total purse for the event was CAD$100,000.

Four teams were invited to participate. They played one semi-final each on January 22, and the winners played in the final on January 23. 
Kevin Martin's rink secured the win, taking home a total of $46,000 in a win over David Murdoch. The total winnings for the Martin rink is $57,000, while Murdoch won $25,000.

Teams
Invited to the 2011 Skins game include the defending champion David Murdoch rink from Scotland, the Olympic champion Kevin Martin rink, the World champion Kevin Koe rink, and the Olympic women's silver medalist Cheryl Bernard rink. The invitation of Bernard is the second time a women's team has been invited, the first being Jennifer Jones in 2009. Bernard held her own against the heavily favoured Olympic men's champion Kevin Martin, losing by $1000 in the semi-final match, despite winning more skins.

Team Bernard
Calgary Curling Club, Calgary, Alberta

Skip: Cheryl Bernard
Third: Susan O'Connor
Second: Carolyn Darbyshire
Lead: Cori Morris

Team Koe
Saville Sports Centre, Edmonton, Alberta

Skip: Kevin Koe
Third: Blake MacDonald
Second: Carter Rycroft
Lead: Nolan Thiessen

Team Martin
Saville Sports Centre, Edmonton, Alberta

Skip: Kevin Martin
Third: John Morris
Second: Marc Kennedy
Lead: Ben Hebert

Team Murdoch
Lockerbie Curling Club, Lockerbie, Scotland

Skip: David Murdoch
Third: Warwick Smith
Second: Glen Muirhead
Lead: Ross Hepburn

Draw to the button
Kevin Koe's team won the draw to the button contest and an additional $1,000. The total team distance from the button was 3.1 cm. Meanwhile, Team Murdoch was 39.8 cm, Team Martin 194.3 cm and Team Bernard at 463.4 cm.

Games
Semi-final dollar amounts
1st & 2nd end: $1000
3rd & 4th end: $1500
5th end: $2000
6th end: $3000
7th end: $4500
8th end: $6500

Koe vs. Murdoch
January 22, 1:00pm EST

Martin vs. Bernard
January 22, 8:00pm EST

Final
January 23, 1:00pm EST

Final game dollar amounts
1st & 2nd end: $2000
3rd & 4th end: $3000
5th end: $4000
6th end: $6000
7th end: $9000
8th end: $13000
+ $15000 bonus for the winner

External links
Promotional site

Casino Rama Curling Skins Game
TSN Skins Game
Curling in Ontario
Casino Rama Curling Skins Game
Casino Rama Curling Skins Game